The 1010s was a decade of the Julian Calendar which began on January 1, 1010, and ended on December 31, 1019.

Significant people
 Abu al-Qasim al-Zahrawi (Abulcasis)
 Abu Nasr Mansur
 Abu Rayhan al-Biruni
 Alhacen (Ibn al-Haytham)
 Avicenna (Ibn Sina)
 Basil II
 Boleslaus I
 Canute
 Fujiwara no Michinaga
 Henry II, Holy Roman Emperor
 Malcolm II of Scotland
 Al-Qadir caliph of Baghdad
 Sweyn I

References

Sources